The 8th British Independent Film Awards, given on 30 November 2005 at the Hammersmith Palais, London, honoured the best British independent films of 2005.

Awards

Best British Independent Film
 The Constant Gardener
 The Descent
 The Libertine
 Mrs Henderson Presents
 A Cock and Bull Story

Best Director
 Neil Marshall - The Descent
 Fernando Meirelles - The Constant Gardener
 Laurence Dunmore - The Libertine
 Stephen Frears - Mrs Henderson Presents
 Michael Winterbottom - A Cock and Bull Story

The Douglas Hickox Award
Given to a British director on their debut feature
 Annie Griffin - Festival
 Julian Jarrold - Kinky Boots
 Laurence Dunmore - The Libertine
 Gaby Dellal - On a Clear Day
 Richard E. Grant - Wah-Wah

Best Actor
 Ralph Fiennes - The Constant Gardener
 Matthew Macfadyen - In My Father's Den
 Chiwetel Ejiofor - Kinky Boots
 Johnny Depp - The Libertine
 Bob Hoskins - Mrs Henderson Presents

Best Actress
 Rachel Weisz - The Constant Gardener
 Natasha Richardson - Asylum
 Judi Dench - Mrs Henderson Presents
 Emily Watson - Wah-Wah
 Joan Allen - Yes

Best Supporting Actor/Actress
 Rosamund Pike - The Libertine
 Bill Nighy - The Constant Gardener
 Tom Hollander - The Libertine
 Kelly Reilly - Mrs Henderson Presents
 Rob Brydon - A Cock and Bull Story

Best Screenplay
 Frank Cottrell Boyce - Millions
 Jeffrey Caine - The Constant Gardener
 Tim Firth and Geoff Deane - Kinky Boots
 Martin Sherman - Mrs Henderson Presents
 Martin Hardy - A Cock and Bull Story

Most Promising Newcomer
 Emily Barclay - In My Father's Den
 Rupert Friend - The Libertine
 Samina Awan - Love + Hate
 Alex Etel - Millions
 Thelma Barlow - Mrs Henderson Presents

Best Achievement in Production
 Gypo
 The Business
 Guy X
 It's All Gone Pete Tong
 Song of Songs

Best Technical Achievement
 Jon Harris - The Descent (for editing)
 César Charlone - The Constant Gardener (for cinematography)
 Ben Van Os - The Libertine (for production design)
 Sandy Powell - Mrs Henderson Presents (for wardrobe)
 Peter Christelis - A Cock and Bull Story (for editing)

Best British Documentary
 The Liberace of Baghdad
 Andrew and Jeremy Get Married
 Black Sun
 McLibel
 Sisters in Law

Best British Short
 Six Shooter
 Can't Stop Breathing
 Dupe
 Pitch Perfect

Best Foreign Film
 Downfall - (Germany) Broken Flowers - (USA)
 Crash - (USA)
 Secuestro Express - (Venezuela)
 The Woodsman - (USA)

The Raindance Award
 Evil Aliens
 Billy Childish Is Dead Sam Jackson's Secret Video Diary''

The Richard Harris Award
 Tilda Swinton

Special Jury Prize
 Sanford Lieberson (Goodtimes Enterprises)

Entertainment Personality Award
 Helen Mirren

External links
 BIFA Homepage

References
 IMDB

British Independent Film Awards
2005 film awards
Independent Film Awards
2005 in London
November 2005 events in the United Kingdom